Severinus of Saxony (28 August 1522, Freiberg – 10 October 1533, Innsbruck) was a Saxon prince of the Albertine line of the House of Wettin.

Life 
Severinus was the second son of the Duke Henry of Saxony (1473–1541) from his marriage to Catherine (1487–1561), daughter of Duke Magnus II of Mecklenburg.  His mother and the educator Balthasar Rysche had a significant influence on the education of Severinus and his older brother Maurice.

When his uncle George the Bearded visited, he would organize a fight between Severinus and his older brother Maurice. Despite his frail health, Severinus always had upper hand in such fights. This gave their father the idea that Maurice was better perhaps suited for an ecclesiastical career.

At the behest of their Catholic uncle George, Duke Severinus was separated from his Lutheran parents and sent to Innsbruck to receive a Catholic education. In Innsbruck, he stayed at the court of the future emperor Ferdinand I and his wife Anna.  He was raised together with their children.  He had Bernhard von Rathschitz as his own private tutor. He was buried in the Cistercian abbey in Stams. His tomb was looted and destroyed in 1552 by the troops of his own brother Maurice during the Schmalkaldic War.

Legacy 
In 1526, Lucas Cranach the Elder made two portraits of the young Princes Maurice and Severinus. The painting of Severinus was created with tempera on wood and measures 57 x 38.5 cm. It is considered an excellent and safe work by Cranach and was included in the overall list of nationally valuable cultural heritage. It is owned by the House of Hesse Foundation and was on loan to the Portland Art Museum between 2005 and 2006.

Ancestors

References and sources 
 Friedrich Albert von Langenn: Moritz, Herzog und Churfürst zu Sachsen: eine Darstellung aus dem …, Part 1, p. 51 ff.
 Eduard Machatschek: Geschichte des Königreichs Sachsen: Nach glaubewürdigen Quellen: Akten …, p. 301
 Joseph Hormayr zu Hortenburg: Die goldene Chronik von Hohenschwangau, der Burg der Welfen, der …, p. 77
 Theodor Distel: Ein untergegangenes sächsisches Fürstenmonument in Tirol aus der ersten Hälfte des sechzehnten Jahrhunderts. Mit dem Totenbilde des Herzogs Severin zu Sachsen, in: Mitteilungen des Vereins für Geschichte der Stadt Meissen, vol II, Meissen 1891, p. 405–409
 Julius Erbstein: Zwei unbekannte Knabenbildnisse Lukas Cranach’s des älteren, nach einer Medaille festgestellt, in: Münz- und Medaillenfreund vol. 1 issue. 5–7, 1899, pp. 33–36, 41–44, 49–53
 Max J. Friedländer, J. Rosenberg: Die Gemälde von Lucas Cranach, Basel, 1979
 Romedio Schmitz-Esser und Elena Taddei: Der Todesfall des Herzogs Severin von Sachsen in Tirol – Ein Obduktionsbericht des habsburgischen Hofarztes Georg Tannstätter von 1533, in: Virus 5, 2005, p. 9–21
 Romedio Schmitz-Esser and Robert Rebitsch: Herzog Severin von Sachsen. Aufenthalt und Tod eines jungen Sachsenherzogs in Tirol, in: Tiroler Heimat, issue 69, 2005, p. 121–142
 Ed. Heyck: Cranachstudien. K.W. Hiersemann, Leipzig, 1900, Digitized

External links 
 Schutz des Kulturgutes – Catalog of nationally valuable cultural assets in accordance with § 6 paragraph 2 of the law to protect German cultural goods from emigration (PDF; 484 kB)

Footnotes 

House of Wettin
1522 births
1533 deaths
16th-century German people
Albertine branch
Sons of monarchs